is a JR West railway station located in Nagato, Yamaguchi Prefecture, Japan.

History 
Kiwado station opened on 9 December 1928.

Cargo handling at this station was discontinued in 1963.

With the privatization of Japanese National Railways (JNR) on 1 April 1987, the station came under the control of JR West.

References

External links

 Official station website (in Japanese)

Railway stations in Japan opened in 1928
Railway stations in Yamaguchi Prefecture
Sanin Main Line
Stations of West Japan Railway Company